Bolesław Karol Szymański (born 22 April 1950 in Pasłęk) is the Claire and Roland Schmitt Distinguished Professor at the Department of Computer Science and the Founding Head of the Center for Network Science and Technology, Rensselaer Polytechnic Institute. He's known for multiple contributions into computer science, including Szymański's algorithm.

Current Work
Szymański is the Director of the Social Cognitive Networks Academic Research Center, which studies the fundamentals of social and cognitive network science;  the center is a part of the Network Science Collaborative Technology Alliance funded by the United States Army. He is also the Principal Investigator in the International Technology Alliance.  His projects include dynamic processes on networks, hidden groups in social networks, sensor network protocols and algorithms, and large-scale parallel and distributed computing and simulation.  He received ITA Distinguished Service Award in 2007. Szymański is also one of the Principals in the MilkyWay@home project that seeks to model the streams of stars in the Milky Way Galaxy that were pulled from nearby galaxies (e.g. Saggitarius). Szymański was also a visiting professor at University of Pennsylvania, Stanford University, and Wrocław University of Technology and a member of the Kosciuszko Foundation Collegium of Eminent Scientists of Polish Origin and Ancestry.

Current Positions
His current positions (Jan 2011) are :
Claire and Roland W. Schmitt Distinguished Professor] of Computer Science
Director, Social Cognitive Networks Academic Research Center
Director, the Rensselaer Center for Network Science and Technology (NEST)
Foreign Member, Polish Academy of Sciences
Editor-in-Chief, Scientific Programming
Editorial Board, Scalable Computing: Practice and Experience
Editorial Board, Computing and Informatics
Editorial Board, Computer Science (journal)

Education
In 1968, Szymański won Gold Medal at the X International Mathematical Olympiad in Moscow, USSR. He received his Ph.D. in computer science from Institute of Informatics of PAN, Warsaw in 1976. He pursued an academic career at Warsaw University of Technology, University of Aberdeen, and University of Pennsylvania. He has been with Rensselaer Polytechnic Institute, Troy. NY, since 1985. In 1999, Szymański was elected an IEEE Fellow for his contributions to parallel computing and distributed computing and in 2003 he received the Wiley Distinguished Faculty Award. In 2007, Szymański received the Claire and Roland W. Schmitt Distinguished Professorship at Rensselaer Polytechnic Institute. In 2009, Szymański received the Wilkes Award and Medal for the best paper published in volume 52 of Computer Journal. Also, in 2009, he was elected a foreign member of the Polish Academy of Sciences and joined Division IV of Technical Sciences there.

References

External links 
Home page
Profile at SCOREC (Scientific Computation Research Center)
MilkyWay@home Project
Social Cognitive Network Academic Research Center

Living people
Rensselaer Polytechnic Institute faculty
Fellow Members of the IEEE
1950 births
Polish emigrants to the United States
People from Pasłęk